Ruth Roman (born Norma Roman; December 22, 1922 – September 9, 1999) was an American actress of film, stage, and television.

After playing stage roles on the east coast, Roman relocated to Hollywood to pursue a career in films. She appeared in several uncredited bit parts before she was cast as the leading lady in the western Harmony Trail (1944) and in the title role in the serial film Jungle Queen (1945), her first credited film performances.

Roman first starred in the title role of Belle Starr's Daughter (1948). She achieved her first notable success with a role in The Window (1949) and a year later was nominated for the Golden Globe Award for New Star of the Year – Actress for her performance in Champion (1949). In the early 1950s, she was under contract to Warner Bros., where she starred in a variety of films, including the Alfred Hitchcock thriller Strangers on a Train (1951).

In the mid-1950s, after leaving Warner Bros., Roman continued to star in films and also began playing guest roles for television series. She also worked abroad and made films in England, Italy, and Spain. She was also a passenger aboard the SS Andrea Doria when it collided with another ship and sank in 1956. In 1959, she won the Sarah Siddons Award for her work in the play Two for the Seesaw. Her numerous television appearances earned her a star on the Hollywood Walk of Fame.

Early life and stage experience
Norma Roman was born in Lynn, Massachusetts, to Lithuanian Jewish parents, Mary Pauline (née Gold) and Abraham "Anthony" Roman. She was renamed "Ruth" when a fortune teller told her mother that "Norma" was an unlucky name. Her mother was a dancer, and her father a barker in a carnival sideshow that they owned at Revere Beach, Massachusetts. She had two older sisters, Ann and Eve. Her father died when Ruth was eight, and her mother sold the sideshow. Later, she attended the William Blackstone School and Girls' High School in Boston. She then pursued her desire to become an actress by enrolling in the prestigious Bishop Lee Dramatic School in Boston. After further enhancing her skills performing with the New England Repertory Company and the Elizabeth Peabody Players, Roman moved to New York City, where she hoped to find success on Broadway. Instead, she worked as a cigarette girl, a hat check girl, and a model to make a living and save money.

Career

Roman moved to Hollywood, where she obtained bit parts in several films such as Stage Door Canteen (1943), Ladies Courageous (1944), Since You Went Away (1944), Song of Nevada (1944), and Storm Over Lisbon (1944). She had a featured role in a Harmony Trail (1944), but continued to be mostly unbilled in films such as She Gets Her Man (1945).

Roman was cast in the title role in the 13-episode serial Jungle Queen (1945). Her roles, though, remained small in such films as See My Lawyer (1945), The Affairs of Susan (1945), You Came Along (1945), Incendiary Blonde (1945), Gilda (1946), Without Reservations (1946), A Night in Casablanca (1946), and The Big Clock (1948). While waiting for an opportunity in movies, Roman wrote short stories based on her experiences living in a theatrical boarding house. She sold two of them: The House of the Seven Garbos and The Whip Song.

Roman's career began to improve in the late 1940s when she was cast in a featured role in the 1948 release Good Sam. The next year, she was chosen for the title role in  Belle Starr's Daughter, as a killer in the thriller The Window, and as the wife of the central character in Champion, starring Kirk Douglas.

Warner Bros.
In recognition of Roman's rising status as an actress, Warner Bros. signed her to a long-term contract in 1949, casting her first as a supporting player for Bette Davis in Beyond the Forest and then for Milton Berle and Virginia Mayo in Always Leave Them Laughing. The studio in 1950 cast her as the female lead in Barricade with Dane Clark and Colt .45 with Randolph Scott.

Warners gave her a starring role in Three Secrets (1950) with Eleanor Parker and Patricia Neal. She played a distraught mother waiting to learn whether or not her child survived an airplane crash. This was followed by Dallas (1950), wherein she was Gary Cooper's leading lady. The May 1, 1950, issue of Life magazine featured Roman in a cover story "The Rapid Rise of Ruth Roman".

Roman got top billing in Lightning Strikes Twice (1951), directed by King Vidor with Richard Todd. She was Farley Granger's love interest in Strangers on a Train (1951), directed by Alfred Hitchcock. Roman was top-billed as well in the 1951 thriller Tomorrow Is Another Day, co-starring Steve Cochran. That year, she was also one of many Warners stars in Starlift, the studio's musical tribute to United States military personnel fighting in the Korean War.

She was loaned to MGM for Invitation (1952), then co-starred with Errol Flynn in a B action film, Mara Maru (1952). She went back to MGM to play Glenn Ford's love interest in Young Man with Ideas (1952) and was reunited with Cooper in Blowing Wild (1953), only this time she was billed beneath Barbara Stanwyck.

Post-Warners
	
Roman went to Universal to play Van Heflin's love interest in Tanganyika (1954). At Universal she was a love interest to James Stewart in the Anthony Mann-directed western The Far Country (1955) and at Republic was top billed in The Shanghai Story (1954) with Edmond O'Brien.

Roman did Down Three Dark Streets (1954) with Broderick Crawford, and started appearing on TV in shows like Lux Video Theatre, The Red Skelton Hour, Producers' Showcase, Climax!, General Electric Theatre, Celebrity Playhouse, The Ford Television Theatre and Jane Wyman Presents The Fireside Theatre.

Roman had a good part in England in Joe MacBeth (1955) playing Lady MacBeth, and she was with Van Johnson in The Bottom of the Bottle (1956) and Mayo in Great Day in the Morning (1956).

Roman appeared in the western Rebel in Town (1956) and was top-billed in 5 Steps to Danger (1957). She was in Bitter Victory (1957) and went to Italy to star in Desert Desperados (1959).

Continuing work in theatre
In 1959, Roman won the Sarah Siddons Award for her work in Chicago theatre. She was selected from among 47 nominees based on her performance in Two for the Seesaw.

Back in Hollywood, she played Paul Anka's mother in Look in Any Window (1961).

Television
	
Roman worked regularly in films well up to the late 1950s. Then she began making appearances on television shows. These included recurring roles in NBC's 1965–1966 The Long, Hot Summer and, toward the end of her career, recurring roles in the 1986 season of Knots Landing and several episodes of Murder, She Wrote, both on CBS.

She guest-starred in NBC's Bonanza and Sam Benedict, ABC's The Bing Crosby Show sitcom and its circus drama The Greatest Show on Earth starring Jack Palance, as well as Burke's Law starring Gene Barry and I Spy featuring Robert Culp and Bill Cosby. She also appeared as a fiery redhead in an episode of Gunsmoke.

She appeared in the early 1960s in the medical dramas The Eleventh Hour and  Breaking Point. She starred in a season 3 episode of Mission: Impossible (1968) titled "The Elixir" as Riva Santel as well as a Season 2 episode of Naked City. Many other series featured guest appearances by Roman, including Route 66, The Untouchables (1959 TV series), Mannix, Cannon (TV series), Marcus Welby, M.D., The Mod Squad, The FBI, Tarzan, and The Outer Limits - episode Moonstone - 1964

In 1971 Roman appeared as Marjorie Worth on "The Men From Shiloh" (rebranded name for the TV western The Virginian) in the episode titled "The Angus Killer."

In 1960, Roman was honoured with a star on the Hollywood Walk of Fame at 6672 Hollywood Boulevard for her contribution to television.

Personal life

Roman was married four times.  She had one son, Richard Roman Hall on November 12, 1952 , with husband Mortimer Hall, son of publisher Dorothy Schiff.

She married Hall on December 17, 1950. In 1956, she sued him for divorce, and the divorce decree became final on April 15, 1957.

Roman was a Democrat who supported Adlai Stevenson's campaign during the 1952 presidential election.

SS Andrea Doria sinking
In July 1956, Roman was just finishing a trip to Europe with her three-year-old son Richard. At the port of Cannes they boarded the Italian passenger liner SS Andrea Doria as first-class passengers for their return passage to the United States. On the night of July 25, the vessel collided with the Swedish passenger liner MS Stockholm.

Roman was in the Belvedere Lounge when the collision happened and immediately took off her high heels and scrambled back to her cabin barefoot to retrieve her sleeping son. Several hours later, they were both evacuated with the other passengers from the sinking liner. Richard was lowered first into a waiting lifeboat, but before she could follow, the lifeboat departed. Ruth stepped into the next boat and was eventually rescued along with 750 other survivors from the Andrea Doria by the French passenger liner SS Île de France. Richard was rescued by the Stockholm and was reunited with his mother in New York.

Death
Roman died at the age of 76 in her sleep of natural causes at her beachfront villa on Crescent Bay in  Laguna Beach, California, on September 9, 1999.

Partial filmography

Stage Door Canteen (1943) - Girl (uncredited)
Ladies Courageous (1944) - WAF (uncredited)
Since You Went Away (1944) - Envious Girl in Train Station (uncredited)
Song of Nevada (1944) - Dancer (uncredited)
Storm Over Lisbon (1944) - Checkroom Girl (uncredited)
Harmony Trail (1944) - Ann Martin
She Gets Her Man (1945) - Glamour Girl (uncredited)
Jungle Queen (1945, serial) - Lothel - Jungle Queen
See My Lawyer (1945) - Mud Girl (uncredited)
The Affairs of Susan (1945) - Girl at Bright Dollar (uncredited)
You Came Along (1945) - Gloria Revere (uncredited)
Incendiary Blonde (1945) - Chorine (uncredited)
Gilda (1946) - Girl (uncredited)
Without Reservations (1946) - Girl in Negligee (uncredited)
A Night in Casablanca (1946) - Harem Girl (uncredited)
The Big Clock (1948) - Secretary at Meeting (uncredited)
Good Sam (1948) - Ruthie
Belle Starr's Daughter (1948) - Cimarron Rose
Champion (1949) - Emma
The Window (1949) - Mrs. Jean Kellerson
Beyond the Forest (1949) - Carol Lawson
Always Leave Them Laughing (1949) - Fay Washburn
Barricade (1950) - Judith Burns
Colt .45 (1950) - Beth Donovan
Three Secrets (1950) - Ann Lawrence
Dallas (1950) - Tonia Robles
Lightning Strikes Twice (1951) - Shelley Carnes
Strangers on a Train (1951) - Anne Morton
Tomorrow Is Another Day (1951) - Catherine 'Cay' Higgins
Starlift (1951) - Ruth Roman
Invitation (1952) - Maud Redwick
Mara Maru (1952) - Stella Callahan
Young Man With Ideas (1952) - Julie Webster
Blowing Wild  (1953) - Sal Donnelly
Tanganyika (1954) - Peggy Marion
The Far Country (1954) - Ronda Castle
The Shanghai Story (1954) - Rita King
Down Three Dark Streets (1954) - Kate Martell
Joe MacBeth (1955) - Lily MacBeth
The Bottom of the Bottle (1956) - Nora Martin
Great Day in the Morning (1956) - Boston Grant
Rebel in Town (1956) - Nora Willoughby
5 Steps to Danger (1957) - Ann Nicholson
Amère victoire (UK title: Bitter Victory) (1957) - Jane Brand
Desert Desperadoes (1959) - The Woman
Look in Any Window (1961) - Jackie Fowler
Milagro a los cobardes (1962) - Rubén's mother
Love Has Many Faces (1965) - Margot Eliot
The Baby (1973) - Mrs. Wadsworth
The Killing Kind (1973) - Rhea Benson
Impulse (1974) - Julia Marstow
Knife for the Ladies (1974) - Elizabeth
Day of the Animals (1977) - Shirley Goodwyn
The Sacketts (1979) - Rosie
Echoes (1982) - Michael's Mother

Radio appearances

Awards and nomination
 1950 Golden Globe Award for New Star of the Year - Actress for Champion (nominee)
 1959 Sarah Siddons Award for Two for the Seesaw (winner)
 1960 Star for Television on the Hollywood Walk of Fame (winner)

References

Further reading
Sculthorpe, Derek (2022) Ruth Roman A Career Portrait. Jefferson, NC: McFarland & Co., Inc.

External links

Photographs and literature

1922 births
1999 deaths
American film actresses
American stage actresses
American television actresses
American people of Lithuanian-Jewish descent
American people of Polish-Jewish descent
Actresses from Boston
People from Lynn, Massachusetts
20th-century American actresses
Jewish American actresses
Shipwreck survivors
Schiff family
California Democrats
Massachusetts Democrats
20th-century American Jews
Girls' High School (Boston, Massachusetts) alumni